Vera Zhukovets (born 20 March 1976) is a former Belarusian tennis player.

Zhukovets won two singles and four doubles titles on the ITF Circuit in her career. On 10 July 1995, she reached her best singles ranking of world No. 225. On 27 April 1998, she peaked at No. 541 in the doubles rankings.

Playing for Belarus Fed Cup team, Zhukovets has a win/loss of 0–4.

ITF finals

Singles: 6 (3–3)

Doubles: 6 (4–2)

Fed Cup participation

Doubles

References

External links
 
 

1976 births
Living people
Tennis players from Minsk
Belarusian female tennis players